Javier Orlando Yacuzzi (born 15 August 1979 in San Nicolás de los Arroyos) is a former Argentine football defender, he last played for Defensa y Justicia.

Yacuzzi started his career with Club Atlético Platense in the 2nd Division of Argentine football in 2002.

In 2003 Yacuzzi moved down a division to play for Club Atlético Tigre in the Primera B Metropolitana. 2004 saw his return to Primera B Nacional with Gimnasia y Esgrima of Concepción del Uruguay.

In 2004 Yacuzzi joined Tiro Federal and helped the club to win the Apertura 2004 and promotion to the Primera Division for the 2005-2006 season.

2006 saw Yacuzzi move to Arsenal and during the 2006-2007 season he helped Arsenal to two 5th-place finishes which saw the club qualify for the Copa Libertadores for the first time in their history.

On October 25, 2007 Yacuzzi scored 2 goals in the Estadio Jalisco in the quarter final of the Copa Sudamericana 2007 to eliminate Chivas de Guadalajara 3-1 on aggregate.

Titles
primera b nacional 2012 club rosario central Primera B Nacional

External links
 Argentine Primera statistics
Javier Yacuzzi at Football Lineups

1979 births
Living people
People from San Nicolás de los Arroyos
Argentine footballers
Argentine expatriate footballers
Association football defenders
Club Atlético Platense footballers
Club Atlético Tigre footballers
Tiro Federal footballers
Arsenal de Sarandí footballers
Club Tijuana footballers
Club Atlético Huracán footballers
Rosario Central footballers
Defensa y Justicia footballers
Argentine Primera División players
Primera Nacional players
Liga MX players
Expatriate footballers in Mexico
Sportspeople from Buenos Aires Province